Barry Dion Keene (born July 30, 1938) is an American politician.

Keene earned his Bachelor of Arts degree from Stanford University and his law degree from Stanford Law School. He became a member of the California Bar in 1966, and accepted a legal position as a Sonoma County
Deputy District Attorney in 1968. In 1968 he won his first election to the Rincon Valley School Board.

Two years later he won the Democratic nomination for the 2nd Assembly District which included the counties of Del Norte, Humboldt and Mendocino Counties, Lake County and a portion of Sonoma County.

In the 1970 General Election he tried to unseat longtime Republican Assemblyman Frank P. Belotti. However, Keene lost his first race in a narrow election.  Keene successfully ran again for the Assembly in 1972 following the death of Assemblyman Belotti.

Keene served six years in the State Assembly holding leadership positions as the chair of the Assembly Elections and Reapportionment Committee and later, as the chairman of the Assembly Health Committee. In 1979 Keene was urged to consider running for an open vacancy in the State Senate.  The district included the 2nd Assembly District and all of Marin County, spanning over one-third of the entire California coastline, from the Golden Gate Bridge to the Oregon border.

Keene won the election in 1979 and served in several powerful positions in the State Senate until his resignation on December 15, 1992.  While in the Senate, Keene held the Chairmanship of the Senate Judiciary Committee, and later served as the California Senate Majority Leader.  During his political tenure, Keene worked on:

 Bagley-Keene Open Meeting Act (1967), which required official meetings of state boards and commissions to follow rules similar to those of the Brown Act;
 The Keene Act, the first comprehensive medical malpractice statute; and
 The Lempert-Keene-Seastrand Oil Spill Prevention and Response Act of 1990.

Upon leaving the legislature, Keene taught politics at Sacramento State University, University of California at Berkeley, and Stanford.  In 2000, he was appointed by Governor Gray Davis as the Director of the California Department of General Services.  In 2008 he was appointed to the California Student Aid Commission.

References

Cited

External links
Guide to the Barry Keene Papers

1938 births
Living people
Democratic Party California state senators
Democratic Party members of the California State Assembly
People from Sonoma County, California
20th-century American politicians
Stanford University alumni